Stratolaunch LLC is an American aerospace company providing high-speed flight test services. It was originally formed in 2011 to develop a new air-launched space transportation system, with its corporate headquarters located in Seattle, Washington. The company and development project were officially announced in December 2011 by Microsoft co-founder Paul Allen and Scaled Composites founder Burt Rutan, who had previously collaborated on the creation of SpaceShipOne.

The project originally had three primary components: a carrier aircraft being built by Scaled Composites (model Stratolaunch, called "Roc"), a multi-stage payload launch vehicle which was to have been launched at high altitude into space from under the carrier aircraft, plus a mating and integration system by Dynetics.
Ultimately, only the carrier aircraft was fully developed by the time of Paul Allen's death in late 2018.

The carrier aircraft first flew in April 2019, at the Mojave Air and Space Port, reaching  and 165 kn (305 km/h) in a 2 h 29 min flight.

Stratolaunch underwent a change of ownership and major change of direction in mid-2019 as the assets of the company were put up for sale, and some sources suggested that Stratolaunch could cease operations completely. The new owner was identified in December 2019 to be Cerberus Capital Management. CEO Jean Floyd announced that Stratolaunch reacquired staff in the fourth quarter of 2019, growing to 87 employees by mid-December and forecasting a "great year" in 2020 providing high-speed flight test services.

History
The project was started in 2010, almost a year before the public announcement was made. Development costs were initially projected to be US$300 million in 2011. Dynetics actually began work in early 2010 and had approximately 40 employees working on the project . Dynetics was cited as "responsible for the total systems engineering, integration and testing, which includes aerodynamics, loads, and interfaces". It was announced in 2011 that SpaceX was also already working on the design for the rocket-powered space vehicle components of the system, the Falcon 9 Air.

The collaboration with SpaceX ended by 2012. In a 2015 interview, former president Chuck Beames (2014–2016) explained, "SpaceX was a partner, and like a lot of partnerships, it was just determined that it was best we went our separate ways – different ambitions. We were interested in their engines, but Elon and his team, they're about going to Mars, and we're just in a different place, and so I think it was a parting of the ways that was amicable".

Stratolaunch Systems completed its first  composites production building in October 2012. In February 2013, the company completed construction of its  carrier assembly hangar and operations facilities at the Mojave Air and Space Port.

The carrier aircraft was originally projected to make its first test flight in 2015. By October 2013, the first flight of the carrier aircraft was pushed back until 2018 at the earliest, with the first flight of the air-launched rocket expected in 2019 at the earliest.

In 2014, Stratolaunch announced that it was considering multiple launch vehicle options over a range of satellite sizes, and that some development work on the orbital launch vehicle has been slowed down to focus on completion of the carrier aircraft.

In 2014, Stratolaunch Systems was placed under the supervision of Paul Allen's new aerospace company Vulcan Aerospace, a subsidiary of Vulcan Inc. Beames stated, "Vulcan Aerospace is the company within Vulcan that plans and executes projects to shift how the world conceptualizes space travel through cost reduction and on‐demand access. Vulcan Aerospace has its heritage in SpaceShipOne and oversees the Stratolaunch Systems project"

Later in the year, in November 2015, Gary Wentz "stepped down as president and CEO of Stratolaunch Systems to join United Launch Alliance to lead human launch services" for ULA. Vulcan ended its contract with Orbital ATK in mid-2015 and indicated that a decision on a new rocket for the Stratolaunch Carrier Aircraft would be made in late 2015.

In 2017, Fast Company named the Stratolaunch one of the world's most innovative companies citing the air-launch system's size and ability to fly in inclement weather. In April 2017, Stratolaunch formally transitioned its name from Vulcan Aerospace to Stratolaunch Systems Corporation.

In May 2017, the Stratolaunch was rolled out for the first time to begin fueling tests, the first of many ground tests.

In December 2017, the Stratolaunch was rolled out for the first taxi test on the runway at the Mojave Air and Space Port in California. On April 13, 2019, Stratolaunch took to the air for the first time and flew for two and a half hours from the Mojave Air and Space Port. The flight reached a maximum altitude of 4,570 meters and a top speed of 278 kilometers per hour.

In January 2019, Stratolaunch announced it was halting development of its own air-launched family of launch vehicles. This followed the death of Stratolaunch founder Paul Allen in October 2018, who had been the source of funds for the capital intensive development program since its founding in 2011. In April 2019, Jean Floyd remained CEO of Stratolaunch.

On 31 May 2019, it was reported that the company would cease operations and that sale of its assets was being explored. In the event, the company remained in operation and posted job openings, including listings for test pilots, in September 2019.

In October 2019, the company announced continuing regular operation and change of ownership, but did not disclose the identity of the new owner  as Cerberus Capital Management, a specialist in the purchase of distressed companies, until December 2019.

Stratolaunch began to rapidly reacquire staff in the fourth quarter of 2019, growing from just 13 employees in October 2019 to 87 employees by mid-December 2019. The company redirected its mission to providing high-speed flight test services.

Carrier aircraft

This would make it the largest airplane, by wingspan, ever to fly.

The carrier plane will be powered by six Pratt & Whitney PW4000,  thrust-range jet engines, sourced from two used 747-400s that were cannibalized for engines, avionics, flight deck, landing gear and other proven systems to reduce initial development costs. The carrier is designed to have a range of  when flying an air launch mission.

In August 2015, Vulcan Aerospace then-president Chuck Beames said, "In 2016, I think, we'll have the aircraft flying... 80% is fabricated now... about 40% assembled... we should have final assembly done the end of this year or early next year. For the next few years, we'll do all of our test flights out of Mojave... There's already an air corridor that's established by the Air Force for this kind of stuff anyway, and we'll fly out over the Pacific".

In the event, the first Stratolaunch carrier aircraft was not towed out of the Stratolaunch Mojave building to start ground testing until May 2017, at which time the company suggested they were planning for a first "launch demonstration" in 2019.

Over the course of 2018, the Stratolaunch carrier aircraft performed taxi tests of increasing speed at the Mojave airport.

On 9 January 2019, the Stratolaunch carrier aircraft completed a 110 knot taxi test, and released an accompanying photo of the nose landing gear lifted off the ground during the test.

The first successful flight test was performed on Saturday, 13 April 2019. The second flight was performed on 29 April 2021.

Launch vehicle

Launch rocket
Originally SpaceX was intended to provide a liquid-fueled rocket to serve as the means of lifting the Stratolaunch payload delivery vehicle into space by launching it at high altitude from under the carrier aircraft, but collaboration with SpaceX was abandoned in late 2012.

In November 2012, Stratolaunch retained Orbital ATK on a "study contract" to develop and evaluate "several alternative configurations" for the vehicle to be launched from the carrier aircraft.

In May 2014, it was announced that the Pegasus II solid-fuel rocket was not achieving design economic goals and that Stratolaunch had contracted with Aerojet Rocketdyne to build the RL10C-1 dual-motor liquid fuel engines for the launch vehicle.

In October 2016, it was announced that "multiple" Pegasus XL rockets would be used by Stratolaunch.

It was announced, on 13 September 2017, that Stratolaunch had signed an agreement with NASA to providing testing services to support propulsion for a vehicle. It was noted that Stratolaunch hired Jeff Thornburg as vice president of propulsion. Thornberg had worked both on the J-2X engine for NASA and helped develop the Raptor rocket engine at SpaceX. The implication is Stratolaunch has decided to go its own way in developing a launch vehicle. The NASA agreement stated that Stratolaunch plans to deliver the test device for "testing of its propulsion system test article element 1" at NASA's Stennis E1 test stand by the end of May 2018. The test series is scheduled to be completed by the end of 2018.

On 2 November 2018, Stratolaunch completed the first hot-fire test of the "pre-burner" portion of its engine at NASA's Stennis Space Center.

All Stratolaunch development work on its own family of launch vehicles ended in January 2019, but at that time, the company stated it continued to plan to launch the Pegasus XL rocket from the carrier aircraft.

Spaceplanes

Crewed Dream Chaser study

Shortly after losing a NASA contract competition to SpaceX and Boeing in September 2014, Sierra Nevada Corporation announced it had conceptualized a launch system that combined a scaled-down version of the company's Dream Chaser space plane with the Stratolaunch Systems high altitude air-launch system.

In November 2014, Vulcan Aerospace released the results of the SNC/Stratolaunch space transportation architecture, which indicated that a reduced-size Dream Chaser in conjunction with the Stratolaunch-based launch system could provide a number of unique mission capabilities. The concept did not advance into development and was never built.

Black Ice

An internal Stratolaunch concept, the Black Ice spaceplane was revealed in early 2018, as a possible payload for the Stratolaunch system. It would be a fully reusable rocketplane the size of the NASA Space Shuttle orbiter, and initially be robotic, with possible future crewed variant. At the time of announcement in 2018, it was in development with a potential flight tests starting as early as 2019.

Talon-A
, the vehicle is planned to begin flight testing in 2022 and go into operation by 2023. The company reportedly has sufficient funding in place to complete early development through the first hypersonic test flight. , construction of the prototype was underway and portions of the fuselage were complete. In 2022 it was announced that the Talon-A will use Ursa Major Technologies Hadley engine.

Stratolaunch also has a concept in place, for a much larger Talon-Z that would be capable of carrying cargo payloads, and perhaps people as well, to orbit.

Facilities

By 2015, Stratolaunch had built a  fabrication hangar and a  assembly hangar located near Scaled Composites. The first of two manufacturing buildings, the "88,000 square foot facility [to] be used to construct the composite sections of the wing and fuselage sections", was opened for production in October 2012, two months ahead of schedule and on budget. Stratolaunch completed their second Mojave building, the very large hangar facility for the Stratolaunch Carrier Aircraft, in February 2013.

On 31 May 2017, the first Stratolaunch carrier aircraft was towed from the Stratolaunch Mojave hangar to begin ground testing. By late 2017, the plan was to have the first rocket air launch in 2019. This was not achieved.

See also

 White Knight One carrier aircraft
 White Knight Two carrier aircraft
 Comparison of orbital launch systems
 Airborne aircraft carrier
 Lockheed C-5 Galaxy launch of LGM-30 Minuteman
 North American X-15 earliest air-launched, crewed, sub-orbital spacecraft
 LauncherOne, Virgin Orbit's smaller scale proposal similar to StratoLaunch's
 Orbital Sciences Pegasus, a similar but smaller scale system
 Skylon
 Conroy Virtus, a proposed aircraft that could have been the shuttle launch vehicle

References

External links

 

 Original Video – Animation of Stratolaunch with SpaceX Falcon 9 Air launch vehicle, December 2011.
 Revised Video – Animation of Stratolaunch with Orbital Pegasus II launch vehicle, June 2013.
 Video – Stratolaunch Systems Press Conference 2011-12-13
 Thinking big in space, The Economist, Dec 27, 2011.
 Stratolaunch and the X-15
 Stratolaunch First Flight, with landing, Stratolaunch Systems, April 2019.

Stratolaunch Systems
Stratolaunch Systems
Stratolaunch
Stratolaunch
American companies established in 2011
Manufacturing companies established in 2011
Technology companies established in 2011
2019 mergers and acquisitions
Stratolaunch Systems